Oxford Hustlers are an Australian dance band from Sydney, Australia. Composed of DJs Brett Austin, and Murray Hood.  They have worked alongside Katherine Ellis on their debut single "Love U More", a cover of the 1992 hit of "Sunscreem".

Career 
The Oxford Hustlers began their careers in the music industry as DJs on the Sydney club scene. In 2009, they formed Oxford Hustlers. Their name came about from the main party strip "Oxford Street" in Sydney, Australia. In their short time they made a marked impact on the Australian dance music scene, and have produced remixes for artists such as Christina Aguilera, The Saturdays, Wynter Gordon, Inaya Day, The Fierce Collective, and Dirty Laundry. Their debut single in collaboration with Katherine Ellis was released on 15 November 2010 on Fierce Angel.

Discography 
 2010 Oxford Hustlers and Katherine Ellis / "Love U More" / Fierce Angel Records

Remixography 
2009
 Kimberly Davis / "Get Up" / D1 Music (#12 Billboard Hot Dance Club Play Chart)
 Inaya Day produced by Mike Cruz / "Never Had Another Love " / Madtizzy Music (#10 ARIA Club Chart)

2010
 Technero / "One World" / Neon Records (#10 ARIA Club Chart)
 Antoinne Dessant & Inaya Day / "Joy" (#11 ARIA Club Chart)
 Dirty Laundry / "I Want You to Fly" (#23 ARIA Club Chart)
 Kimberly Davis / "Twist of Love" / D1 Music (#9 Billboard Hot Dance Club Play Chart)
 The Fierce Collective Ft. Peyton & Lady V / "Baker Street" / Fierce Angel Records

2011
 Martin Wright feat. Angie Brown / "Can't Get To Sleep" / Fierce Angel Records
 Melissa Indot / "China" / Fierce Angel Records
 Wynter Gordon / "Till Death" / Neon Records (#5 ARIA Club Chart)
 Soraya Vivian vs Digital 96 / "When I'm Dancin'" / Fierce Angel Records
 The Saturdays / "My Heart Takes Over" / Fascination
 7th Heaven ft. Donna Gardier-Elliott / "Don't Make Me Wait" /  Ego
 Bitrocka ft. Sushi / "Give Me The Love"

2012
 Bassmonkeys ft. Lyck / "Embrace My Heart" / Fierce Angel Records
 Guy Sebastian / "Don't Worry Be Happy" / Sony Music Entertainment
 Jolyon Petch & Sam Hill vs Katherine Ellis / "Sexy Dancer" / Club Luxury
 Stan Walker / "Music Won't Break Your Heart" / Sony Music Entertainment
 Jason Derulo / "Pick Up the Pieces" / Warner Bros
 Christina Aguilera / "Your Body" / RCA Records (#1 Billboard Hot Dance Club Play Chart)

2013
 Paulini / "Hearbreak is Over" / Ministry of Sound

References

External links 
 Gusto International
 Fierce Angel

New South Wales musical groups
Remixers
Australian musical duos